The Dabei gas field is a natural gas field located in Xinjiang. It was discovered in 2006 and developed by and China National Petroleum Corporation. It began production in 2007 and produces natural gas and condensates. The total proven reserves of the Dabei gas field are around 5.25 trillion cubic feet (150 km³), and production is slated to be around 479.5 million cubic feet/day (13.7×105m³).

References

Natural gas fields in China